Obelya Glacier is the  long and  wide glacier on the east side of southern Sentinel Range in Ellsworth Mountains, Antarctica, situated south of Remington Glacier, and flowing southeastwards along the southwest side of Johnson Spur and east of Mount Benson to join Thomas Glacier.

The glacier is named after the settlement of Obelya in Western Bulgaria, now part of the city of Sofia.

Location
US mapping in 1961, updated in 1988.

See also
 List of glaciers in the Antarctic
 Glaciology

Maps
 Vinson Massif.  Scale 1:250 000 topographic map.  Reston, Virginia: US Geological Survey, 1988.
 Antarctic Digital Database (ADD). Scale 1:250000 topographic map of Antarctica. Scientific Committee on Antarctic Research (SCAR). Since 1993, regularly updated.

References
 Bulgarian Antarctic Gazetteer. Antarctic Place-names Commission. (details in Bulgarian, basic data in English)
 Obelya Glacier. SCAR Composite Gazetteer of Antarctica

External links
 Obelya Glacier. Copernix satellite image

Glaciers of Ellsworth Land
Bulgaria and the Antarctic